In Guezzam (Arabic: عين قزام, lit. springs of Guezzam; Berber spelling: Gezzam) is a town and commune that is the capital of In Guezzam Province, Algeria, on the border with Niger. Till 26 November 2019 it was part of the Tamanrasset Province. The border town on the Niger side is Assamaka. According to the 2008 census it has a population of 7,045, up from 4,938 in 1998, with an annual growth rate of 3.7%, the second highest in the Tamanrasset province's 2008 boundaries.

History
The commune of In Guezzam was established on 19 December 1984. The district was established in 1986. On 18 December 2019 it became a provincial capital of the new In Guezzam Province.   
-Population history

Geography

In Guezzam lies in the barren Tanezrouft region of far southern Algeria. The landscape is sandy, with frequent sand dunes interspersed with sandstone outcrops.

Climate

In Guezzam has a hot desert climate (Köppen climate classification BWh), with long, extremely hot summers and short, very warm winters. Despite an extremely dry climate, some occasional rainfall occur during the months of August and September due to the influence of the far northern edge of the West African Monsoon, unlike most of the Algerian Desert. Averages high temperatures soar during the height of the long summer season, with daytime highs always over 40 °C (104 °F) during nearly 4 months and even above 45 °C (113 °F).

Transportation

In Guezzam lies on the Trans-Sahara Highway, at the end of the N1 Algerian national highway, which leads north to Tamanrasset and eventually Algiers. The road continues southeast to Arlit in Niger. In Guezzam is also served by In Guezzam Airport, which is, however, closed for public usage.

Education

1.7% of the population has a tertiary education (the equal lowest rate in the province), and another 4.9% has completed secondary education. The overall literacy rate is 39.4%, and is 50.7% among males and 29.1% among females; all three rates are the lowest in the province.

Localities
The commune is composed of six localities:

In Guezzam
In Azaoua
Laouni
In Ataye
Garet Nous
Hassi in Tafouk

References

States and territories established in 1984
States and territories established in 1986
Communes of In Guezzam Province
Algeria–Niger border crossings